Emma Caulfield Ford (born April 8, 1973) is an American actress. She is best known for her starring role as former demon Anya Jenkins on the supernatural drama television series Buffy the Vampire Slayer (1998–2003), which earned her a nomination for the Satellite Award for Best Cast. She had recurring roles as Susan Keats on the Fox teen drama series Beverly Hills, 90210 (1995–1996), as Emma Bradshaw on the CW teen drama series Life Unexpected (2010–2011), and as Sarah Proctor on the Disney+ miniseries WandaVision (2021), a role she will reprise in its spin-off Agatha: Coven of Chaos (2023). She starred in the supernatural horror film Darkness Falls (2003) and in the romantic comedy film Timer (2009), and had a supporting role in the comedy film Back in the Day (2014).

Life and career
Caulfield was born on April 8, 1973, in San Diego, California, to Denise and Rodney Chukker. Caulfield's first notable role was as Brandon Walsh's girlfriend, Susan Keats, on Beverly Hills, 90210 in 1995. She appeared for thirty episodes in the series before departing in 1996. In 1998, Caulfield starred in her most famous role to date, as Anya Jenkins on the WB's hit show Buffy the Vampire Slayer. Originally, her character was only to appear for two episodes. However, audiences responded well to Anya, resulting in Buffy the Vampire Slayer creator Joss Whedon's decision to add her to the main cast. In 2003, Caulfield landed her first lead role in the horror movie Darkness Falls, which debuted at number one in the U.S. box office. In 2004, she appeared on Monk as Meredith Preminger in the episode "Mr. Monk and the Girl Who Cried Wolf".

Caulfield also produced and starred in the satire Bandwagon, playing a fictionalized version of herself. The movie was written and directed by close friend and fellow actress Karri Bowman. It screened at various festivals, although it has not been picked up for distribution. Several members of Buffy the Vampire Slayer cast and crew have cameos in the film. In 2010, Caulfield posted the original Bandwagon to YouTube along with a 12-part webseries sequel set several years later.

Caulfield is also the co-author of the webcomic Contropussy, which has been published by IDW Publishing.

Caulfield starred in the independent feature film TiMER, released May 2009. She starred as the lead role in the FunnyOrDie short film, Don't Panic, It's Organic. In 2012, she received critical acclaim for her guest appearance on the ABC fantasy series Once Upon a Time, as the Blind Witch from the fairytale Hansel and Gretel. She guest starred in the second season of the Jane Espenson scripted romantic comedy web series, Husbands.

Personal life
Caulfield was married to Cornelius Grobbelaar from 2006 to 2010.

In 2016, Caulfield confirmed that she was expecting a child with Mark Leslie Ford. She gave birth to a daughter later that year.

In October 2022, Caulfield announced that she has multiple sclerosis.

Filmography

Film

Television

Awards and nominations
Beverly Hills Film Festival
2007: Won, "Best Actress in a Short Film" – Hollow

Satellite Awards
2003: Nominated, "Best Performance by an Actress in a Supporting Role in a Drama Series" – Buffy the Vampire Slayer

Saturn Awards
2003: Won, "Cinescape Genre Face of the Future Award (Female)" – Darkness Falls & Buffy the Vampire Slayer

Sydney Film Festival
2007: Won, "Best Performance by an Actress in a Leading Role" – Hollow

References

External links

 
 
 

American expatriates in England
American film actresses
American soap opera actresses
American television actresses
American voice actresses
American people of English descent
American people of German descent
American people of Luxembourgian descent
American people of Portuguese descent
Living people
Actresses from San Diego
People educated at the American School in England
20th-century American actresses
21st-century American actresses
American Christians
1973 births
People with multiple sclerosis